The Apa Mare (also Vâna Ciurei or Apa Neagră) is a right tributary of the river Bega Veche in Romania. It discharges into the Bega Veche in Beregsău Mare.

References

Rivers of Romania
Rivers of Timiș County
Rivers of Arad County